This article refers to crime in the U.S. state of South Carolina.

Statistics
In 2008 there were 192,751 crimes reported in South Carolina, including 307 murders. In 2014 there were 174,269 crimes reported, including 311 murders.

Capital punishment laws

Capital punishment is applied in this state.

See also
Vinson Filyaw

References